This article provides a list of operated high-speed rail networks, listed by country or region.

Overview
The following table is an overview of high speed rail in service or under construction by country, ranked by the amount in service. The list is based on UIC figures (International Union of Railways), updated with other sources.

By region

Freight high-speed railway services

Missile carriers

Non-revenue or unfinished

High-speed networks under construction

Austria 
All high-speed railway lines in Austria are upgraded lines.

Baltic States (Estonia, Latvia, Lithuania)

Dedicated high-speed line 

Connections to Russian, Polish and Finnish high-speed railways are under planning.

Belgium

Dedicated high-speed line

China

Denmark 

Denmark has a signalling system allowing max 180 km/h. There is a plan to replace it with ETCS before 2030. On some lines, 200 km/h or more will be allowed as a direct result, without upgrading other things.
Peberholm–Oresund Bridge has Swedish signalling system allowing max 200 km/h since 2000.

Finland

New main lines

Upgraded lines

France

Dedicated high-speed lines 
French figures of LGV length count only new tracks and not total length between terminal stations (i.e.: 409 km instead of 425 km for the LGV Sud-Est)

Upgraded lines

Germany

Dedicated high-speed lines

Upgraded lines

India

Routes 

In India, trains in the future with top speeds of 300–350 km/h, are envisaged to run on elevated corridors to isolate high-speed train tracks and thereby prevent trespassing by animals or people. The current conventional lines between Amritsar–New Delhi, and Ahmedabad–Mumbai runs through suburban and rural areas, which are flat and have no tunnels. The Ahmedabad–Mumbai line runs near the coast and therefore, has more bridges, and parts of it are in backwaters or forests. The 1987 RDSO/JICA feasibility study found the Mumbai-Ahmedabad line to be the most promising.

The government of Kerala state has also expressed interest in constructing a high-speed rail corridor by the name of Silverline under K-Rail corporation to carry both freight and passengers along the length of the state, from Kasargod in the north end to the state capital, Thiruvananthapuram in the south end. The project is estimated to be completed by 2025 and is expected to cost .

Feasibility studies 

Multiple pre-feasibility and feasibility studies have been done or are in progress.

The consultants for pre-feasibility study for four corridors are:
Systra France's Company for Delhi-Panipat-Ambala-Chandigarh-Ludhiana-Jalandhar-Amritsar,
Systra, Italferr and RITES Limited for Pune–Mumbai–Ahmedabad,
British firm Mott MacDonald for Delhi–Agra–Lucknow–Varanasi–Patna
INECO, PROINTEC, Ayesa for Howrah-Haldia
Japan External Trade Organization (JETRO) and Oriental Consultancy along with Parsons Brinckerhoff India for Chennai–Vijayawada–Dornakal–Kazipet–Hyderabad

In September 2013, an agreement was signed in New Delhi to complete a feasibility study of high-speed rail between Ahmedabad and Mumbai, within 18 months. The study will cost ¥500 million and the cost will be shared 50:50 by Japan and India.

Location of the stations, its accessibility, integration with public transport, parking and railway stations design will play an important role in the success of the high speed railway system. Mumbai may have an underground corridor to have high-speed rail start from the CST terminal. European experiences have shown that railway stations outside the city receive less patronage and ultimately make the high-speed railway line unfeasible.

The feasibility study for the Chennai-Bengaluru high-speed rail corridor was completed by Germany in November 2018. The study found that the route was feasible. The proposed corridor would be 435 km long and would have an end-to-end travel time of 2 hours and 25 minutes with trains operating at a speed of 320 km/h. The study proposed constructing 84% of the track on viaducts, 11% underground and the remaining 4% at-grade. The current fastest train on the Chennai-Bengaluru route, the Shatabdi Express, completes the journey in 7 hours.

Diamond Quadrilateral project 

The Diamond Quadrilateral high-speed rail network project is set to connect the four major metro cities of India namely: Chennai, Delhi, Kolkata, and Mumbai. Prime minister of India mentioned in his address to the joint session of Parliament on 9 June 2014 that the new Government was committing to build the dream project. Although the route is not yet planned, the alignment could follow the existing Golden Quadrilateral railway line which links other major cities.

Classic upgraded lines

Indonesia

Dedicated high-speed lines

Italy

Dedicated high-speed lines

Upgraded lines

Japan

Dedicated high-speed lines

Maglev lines

Laos

Morocco

Dedicated high-speed line

Upgraded line

Dedicated high-speed lines planned

Netherlands

Dedicated high-speed line

Upgraded lines

Norway

Poland

Upgraded lines

Dedicated lines

Portugal

Upgraded lines

Dedicated lines

Romania

Upgraded lines

Russia

Upgraded lines

Dedicated lines

Saudi Arabia

Dedicated high-speed lines

Classic upgraded lines

South Korea

Dedicated high-speed lines

Upgraded lines

Spain

Dedicated high-speed line (operational)

Upgraded lines

Sweden

Dedicated

Upgraded lines 

 The lines marked with * were to a large part given a new alignment when upgrading from single track, essentially making them new lines. The other ones were straight enough for 200 km/h already.
There are plans to upgrade some lines to 250 km/h when the ERTMS signalling system is introduced in 2025–2030.

Switzerland

Rail 2000 high-speed lines

Other projects

Taiwan

Dedicated high-speed line

Thailand

Dedicated high-speed line

Turkey

Dedicated high-speed lines

Upgraded lines

United Kingdom

Dedicated high-speed lines

Upgraded lines

United States

Upgraded lines

Dedicated high-speed lines 
The United States has no dedicated high speed rail lines—the following are either under construction or planned.

Maglev Lines

Uzbekistan

References and notes

 Railway lines